György Kamarás (born 17 March 1998) is a Hungarian footballer who currently plays for NK Nafta 1903.

Club career
On 10 March 2018 he was signed by Nemzeti Bajnokság I club Balmazújvárosi FC.

Club statistics

Updated to games played as of 16 December 2018.

References 

1998 births
Living people
Footballers from Budapest
Hungarian footballers
Hungarian expatriate footballers
Hungary youth international footballers
Association football forwards
Budapest Honvéd FC II players
Dorogi FC footballers
Balmazújvárosi FC players
Gyirmót FC Győr players
NK Nafta Lendava players
Nemzeti Bajnokság I players
Nemzeti Bajnokság II players
Slovenian Second League players
Hungarian expatriate sportspeople in Slovenia
Expatriate footballers in Slovenia